Chinese Revenge is a song performed by Italian synth-pop group Koto. Released in 1982, it was their debut single. Composed by Anfrando Maiola, and produced by Stefano Cundari and Alessandro Zanni, it proved a big hit in Italy, selling over 10,000 copies. Unlike Koto's next batch of singles, "Chinese Revenge" is more of a downtempo track, rather than a high-energy italo-disco song. In 1985, the song was remixed by Marc Hartman, and again in 1989 by Michiel van der Kuy, with a more house flavour.

Track listings

12" single 
1. Chinese Revenge (Club Mix) (6:18)
2. Chinese Revenge (Dub Mix) (6:00)

7" single 
1. Chinese Revenge (Club Mix) (3:35)
2. Chinese Revenge (Dub Mix) (3:35)

1985 12" single 
1. Chinese Revenge (New Mix) (7:07)
2. Chinese Revenge (Club Mix) (6:18)
3. Chinese Revenge (Dub Mix) (6:00)

Asia version-89 CD/12" 
1. Chinese Revenge (Asia Version-89) (4:57)
2. Chinese Revenge (Original Version-83) (6:18)

Asia version-89 Maxi 
1. Chinese Revenge (Asia Version-89)
2. The Samples (0:40)
3. Chinese Revenge (Original Version-83) (6:18)
4. Chinese Revenge (Edited Asia Version-89) (3:50)

References

External links
Discogs entry

1982 singles
Koto (band) songs
1982 songs